Massive Chalice is a turn-based tactics video game for Microsoft Windows, OS X,  Linux and Xbox One by Double Fine Productions, which was funded through Kickstarter.  The project leader of the game was Brad Muir, who was previously the project leader of Iron Brigade.

Gameplay
In Massive Chalice, the player takes the role of an immortal ruler defending their kingdom, called "the nation", from invasion by an evil force known as the Cadence, whose very touch is deadly to most humans and who leave magical corruption in their wake. (S)He is aided by the titular Massive Chalice, a magical artifact whose two personalities advise the player. The Chalice can banish the Cadence, but will take 300 years to build up the magical energy to do so.

The game switches between two modes: Strategy, in which the player makes long-term decisions and watches the years roll by, and Tactical, in which the player commands teams of heroes in turn-based battles against Cadence forces. In Strategy mode, the player decides which tasks the Chalice will spend its small amount of spare energy on, while also dealing with problems that arise in the kingdom's population. While the player waits for long-term projects to complete, the Cadence will regularly attack. Usually they attack multiple parts of the kingdom at once, but as the Chalice can only send a team of heroes to one location at a time, the player must decide which battle to fight to keep Cadence corruption from destroying the land.

As the player's character is bound to the chalice and is unable to leave the palace, (s)he must send other heroes to fight the Cadence. Though these heroes are also attuned to the chalice, allowing them to survive contact with the Cadence, they are not immortal, and so a crucial part of Strategy mode is establishing bloodlines to breed future generations of heroes to ensure success over three centuries. The player can retire a hero to become regent of a noble house, and arranging a marriage to a hero from another house. New heroes inherit some genetic traits from their parents, as well as personality. A house may be established by any combination of male and female heroes, and while same-sex couples cannot have children on their own, the chalice can find babies elsewhere in the kingdom who are attuned to it to be adopted by a noble house. Such children have their own genes but may still inherit personality traits from their adoptive parents or during training.

Heroes initially belong to one of three classes: Caberjacks, melee warriors who wield battering-ram like "cabers"; Hunters, who use giant crossbows to attack from a distance; and Alchemists, who use bladed Throwers to hurl flasks of explosives or attack close up. Children of a noble house learn their regent parent's class, but if the regent's partner is from another class, they train in one of two variant "hybrid" classes. As heroes age, their statistics change; for example young heroes are faster but not as strong or smart as others, while very old heroes may be slower and weaker but much wiser. Heroes may also develop new personality traits depending on their experiences in battle. If a distinguished hero dies on the battlefield, her/his personal weapon may become a Relic, a magical artefact that is then passed down to younger members of his/her house.

Development
In May 2013, Massive Chalice became the focus of Double Fine's second Kickstarter campaign, after Broken Age (formerly known as Double Fine Adventure) in 2012.  The Double Fine team had learned from their mistakes on the first kickstarter and opted to not show as much exclusive material to backers, as this created a rift between the backers and non-backers, as well as members of the press.  Kickstarter backers influenced the development of the game when the ability for same sex marriage was added to the game after a number of requests.  Brad Muir stated that backer input before development was one of the advantages of Kickstarter, since a feature such as this might not have been thought about until the game was almost completed, which would have made it harder to implement.

The game was originally expected to be released in September 2014 until the game was delayed. The beta version of the game, for people who backed the game at a high enough pledge level to get beta access, was released on October 21, 2014.  It was released on Steam Early Access on November 11, 2014.  It was released for Microsoft Windows and Xbox One on June 1, 2015.

Reception

Massive Chalice received "mixed or average" reviews, according to review aggregator Metacritic.

Destructoid gave the game a six, calling nation management "simple and sterile" while writing, "Massive Chalice is both beautiful and approachable, somewhat rare qualities in the genre...By mid-game, what was novel and enticing becomes a slog". Game Informer called the title "rough around the edges, but hard to put down", criticizing its graphics, lack of attention to detail, user interface, and lackluster score, while praising its compelling gameplay. Eurogamer recommending the game, writing, " your enjoyment of Massive Chalice will depend largely on your willingness to meet its bigger ideas halfway. Most notably, you need to accept that it's more about making the best of a flawed hand than building a perfect system", noting that the experience was tough and called the title "a huge return to form" for Double Fine. IGN criticized the game's inability to give the player's decisions weight, saying, "As much as I enjoyed its aggressive brand of tactical combat and interesting enemy types, there are too many unpredictable variables outside your control, and too much happening to too many quickly aging, mortal characters for this tactical game to feel like decisions matter". PC Gamer criticized the poor AI and called the combat "well-executed but insubstantial", while noting that the bloodlines concept was by far Massive Chalice's greatest feature. GameSpot similarly praised the game's eugenics experiments, combat, lighthearted tone, while criticizing its art style and heroes for lacking personality and its inability to express important information to the player. Shacknews lamented the steep learning curve, lack of a cover system, and amount of factors left to chance, while lauding the bloodline system, tactical gameplay, and ending.

References

External links
 Official website
 Official blog
 

2015 video games
Double Fine games
Fantasy video games
Kickstarter-funded video games
Linux games
MacOS games
Indie video games
Single-player video games
Strategy video games
Turn-based strategy video games
Turn-based tactics video games
Video games developed in the United States
Windows games
Xbox One games
Early access video games